António Ng Kuok Cheong (born September 26, 1957) is currently a member in the Macau Legislative Assembly, returned by direct election. He was the founding chairman of the pro-democratic political party New Macau Association. He is also the leader of the political pressure group Union for Democracy Development. Ng has been a major figure in the Macau democracy movement and is one of the three pro-democratic legislators in the Assembly.

After his graduation from Yuet Wah College, Macau, Ng obtained his undergraduate degree in economics at Chinese University of Hong Kong. Once an employee in a Chinese bank in the early 1990s, Ng lost the job due to political pressure from Beijing.

Election results

See also
 Politics of Macau

References

External links
 Antonio Ng's blog (in Chinese)

Members of the Legislative Assembly of Macau
Cantonese people
People from Nanhai District
1957 births
Living people
New Macau Association politicians
Politicians from Foshan